David Louis Dalton (December 31, 1822 – November 13, 1894) served as the 12th Secretary of State of Alabama from 1865 to 1867.

After his tenure as Secretary of State, he served as private secretary to Governor William Hugh Smith from 1868 to 1870 and as a clerk in the Alabama Department of Education.

He married his second wife Kate Louisa Darby (1822-1901) in June 1845, and had two children.

References

1822 births
1894 deaths
Alabama Democrats
Secretaries of State of Alabama